The Catagunya Power Station is a run-of-the-river hydroelectric power station located in the Central Highlands region of Tasmania, Australia. The power station is situated on the Lower River Derwent catchment and is owned and operated by Hydro Tasmania.

Technical details
Part of the Derwent scheme that comprises eleven hydroelectric power stations, the Catagunya Power Station is the seventh power station in the scheme and the third power station in the lower run-of-river system. The power station is located aboveground below Lake Catagunya, a small storage created by the rock-filled Catagunya Dam on the Derwent River below its junction with the Nive River. Water from the Derwent from Liapootah Power Station and spill from Liapootah Dam flows into Wayatinah Lagoon. It then descends  through three steel penstocks to the Wayatinah Power Station. The tunnel intake structure is provided with two vertical lift, gravity close intake gates designed to cut off full flow. Each of the three steel penstocks is provided with a hilltop valve designed to close under full flow.

Within the station building, each turbine has a semi-embedded spiral casing, and water flow is controlled via twin radial gates installed at the entrance to each penstock and designed to cut off full flow. No inlet valves are installed in the station. The station output, estimated to be  annually, is fed to TasNetworks' transmission grid via two 11 kV/220 kV ASEA generator transformers to the outdoor switchyard.

Engineering heritage 
The dam received a Historic Engineering Marker from Engineers Australia as part of its Engineering Heritage Recognition Program.

See also 

List of power stations in Tasmania

References

External links
Hydro Tasmania page on the Lower Derwent

Energy infrastructure completed in 1960
Hydroelectric power stations in Tasmania
Central Highlands (Tasmania)
Run-of-the-river power stations